Rosemary Forsyth is an American actress most notable for her role as Bronwyn opposite Charlton Heston in The War Lord in 1965.

Early years 
Forsyth was born in Montreal, Quebec. Her father, David Forsyth, was Scots-Canadian; her mother was an Irish American who worked as a model in New York using her maiden name, Rosemary Collins. Her parents separated when she was an infant, and at five years of age she and her mother moved to New York. She studied drama in high school and college and became a model as a teenager. Educated in Stockbridge, Massachusetts, she added to her acting studies by attending the Wynn Handman Drama School in New York. Before she became a model, she worked as a file clerk and a counselor at a camp.

Career 
A caption under Forsyth's picture in Life reported, "Rosemary ... was plucked out of a magazine by Universal, then sent to New York for 18 months to act in TV, summer stock, anywhere she could find seasoning jobs."

She made her acting debut in 1963 on the TV series Route 66 as Claire in episode No. 101, "I Wouldn't Start from Here". She made her film debut in 1965 in Shenandoah from Universal Pictures as James Stewart's daughter.

She starred in The War Lord with Charlton Heston, and the western comedy Texas Across the River with Dean Martin.

Forsyth's other notable film credits during the 1960s and '70s include What Ever Happened to Aunt Alice?, Some Kind of a Nut, How Do I Love Thee?, The Brotherhood of the Bell, City Beneath the Sea, Black Eye, and with Heston again in the disaster film Gray Lady Down.

By 1971, she started appearing on television frequently. She starred in a pilot for the television series Is There a Doctor in the House?, about a young city doctor who moves to the country to work with a crusty older doctor played by William Windom, but the series was not picked up by the networks. From the mid-1970s and on, she worked primarily in television. She was featured in the Columbo television series episode "Murder by the Book", directed by Steven Spielberg. She was also in several episodes of Mannix.

In the early 1960s, Forsyth was the second actress to play Joan Miller on The Defenders. She portrayed Sophia Wayne Capwell on Santa Barbara (1984). She played the fourth Laura Spencer Horton on Days of Our Lives, from 1976–1980, and appeared as Ann McFadden on Dallas (1985).

She guest-starred on such television shows as Fantasy Island, Magnum, P.I., Charlie's Angels, Remington Steele, JAG, Star Trek: Voyager, Murder, She Wrote, Chicago Hope, and ER. She appeared in the films The Gladiator (1986), A Case for Murder (1993), Exit to Eden (1994), Daylight (1996), and Girl (1998).  She had a role in 1994's Disclosure, a film starring Michael Douglas based on a novel by Michael Crichton. She also could be seen on Match Game at the time.

Personal life 
Forsyth was married to actor Michael Tolan. In 1972, she married Ron Waranch. In 1980, she married Alan Skip Horwits.

Recognition 
In 1966, Forsyth was nominated for a Golden Globe Award  as New Star of the Year-Actress for her work in Shenandoah.

Selected filmography 
 Shenandoah (1965) as Jennie Anderson
 The War Lord (1965) as Bronwyn
 Texas Across the River (1966) as Phoebe
 It Takes a Thief (in episode "When Good Friends Get Together", 1968) as Miss Harris
 Where It's At (1969) as Diana Mayhew Smith
 What Ever Happened to Aunt Alice? (1969) as Harriet Vaughn
 Some Kind of a Nut (1969) as Pamela Anders
 How Do I Love Thee? (1970) as Marion Waltz
 The Brotherhood of the Bell (1970) as Vivian Masters Patterson
 City Beneath the Sea (1971) as Lia Holmes
 Is There a Doctor in the House (1971) as Dr. Michael Griffin
 The Death of Me Yet (1971) as Sybil Towers
 Night Gallery (in segment "Deliveries in the Rear", 1972) (Season 2, Ep 53) as Barbara Bennet
 Columbo: Murder by the Book (1971) (directed by Steven Spielberg)
 One Little Indian (1973) (cameo)
 Black Eye (1974) as Miss Francis
 Mannix in the "Portrait of a Shadow" (1974)
 Kung Fu (1974) as Ellie Crowell in the episode 'A Small Beheading' (Season 3, Episode 42)
 My Father's House (1975) as Judith Lindholm
 Days of Our Lives (1965) as Laura Spencer Horton (unknown episodes, 1976–1980)
 Gray Lady Down (1978) as Vickie Blanchard
  The Incredible Hulk as Ellen Schulte (Season 4, Episode 4)
 Fantasy Island as Dr. Melanie Elisabeth Griffin (3 episodes, 1980–1983)
 WKRP in Cincinnati (1981) as Joyce Armor
 Magnum, P.I. (in episode "Legacy from a Friend", 1983) as Margaret Chase
 Santa Barbara as Sophia Wayne Capwell (40 episodes, 1984)
 Remington Steele as Marjorie Flowers (1 episode, 1984)
 Murder, She Wrote as Andrea Reed (in episode "My Johnny Lies Over the Ocean", 1985)
 Dallas as Ann McFadden (3 episodes, 1985)
 Mr. Belvedere as Ilsa Hufnagel (1 episode) and Louise (2 episodes—2 part finale 1990)
 The Gladiator (1986) as Loretta Simpson
 A Case for Murder (1993) as Judge Helen McCoy
 Exit to Eden (1994) as Mrs. Brady
 Disclosure (1994) as Stephanie Kaplan
 Melissa (1995) as Dr. Gardner
 The Other Women (1995) as Dr. Angela Crane
 Daylight (1996) as Ms. London
 JAG as Senator Grace Marion (1 episode, 1996)
 Star Trek: Voyager as Alzen (1 episode, 1997)
 Dharma & Greg as Merrill (2 episodes, 1997–1998)
 Girl (1998) as mother
 Valerie Flake (1999) as Irene Flake
 Chicago Hope as Dr. Edith Strauss (2 episodes, 1997–2000)
 ER as Judy (1 episode, 2000)
 Ghosts of Mars (2001) as Inquisitor
 Ally McBeal as Judge Martha Graves (2 episodes, 2000–2001)]
 Providence as Elaine (1 episode, 2002)
 A Time to Remember (2003) as Dorothy Walderson
 Monk as Marcia Ellison (1 episode, 2004)
 NYPD Blue as Felicia Heilbrenner (1 episode, 2005)
 Without a Trace as Martha Scoggins (2 episodes, 2002–2005)
 Sweet Nothing in My Ear (2008) as Louise Miller

References

External links 
 

American film actresses
American soap opera actresses
American television actresses
Canadian film actresses
Canadian soap opera actresses
Canadian television actresses
Canadian emigrants to the United States
Living people
Actresses from Montreal
American people of Cornish descent
21st-century American women
Year of birth missing (living people)